François Rochebloine (born 31 October 1945 in Saint-Chamond, Loire) is a former member of the National Assembly of France.  He represented Loire's 3rd constituency,  and is a member of the New Centre. The Azerbaijani government has blacklisted Rochebloine who visited Nagorno-Karabakh in June 2010 without Baku’s permission.

References

1945 births
Living people
People from Saint-Chamond
Politicians from Auvergne-Rhône-Alpes
Union for French Democracy politicians
The Centrists politicians
Democratic European Force politicians
Union of Democrats and Independents politicians
Deputies of the 9th National Assembly of the French Fifth Republic
Deputies of the 10th National Assembly of the French Fifth Republic
Deputies of the 11th National Assembly of the French Fifth Republic
Deputies of the 12th National Assembly of the French Fifth Republic
Deputies of the 13th National Assembly of the French Fifth Republic
Deputies of the 14th National Assembly of the French Fifth Republic